Dmitri Viktorovich Kharine (born 16 August 1968) is a Russian football coach and former professional footballer, who is goalkeeping coach of National League South side Hemel Hempstead Town.

As a player, he was a goalkeeper from 1982 until 2004, notably in the Premier League for Chelsea, after playing for Moscow clubs Torpedo, Dynamo and CSKA. He finished his professional career in the Scottish Premier League with Celtic, before returning to England to play for non-league Hornchurch. He earned international caps for the USSR, CIS and the Russian national football teams. 

Kharine joined Luton Town in 2004 as goalkeeping coach, and remained with the club until 2013, later joining Stevenage and Hemel Hempstead Town in a similar capacity.

Club career

Russian football
He played for Russian sides Torpedo Moscow, Dynamo Moscow and CSKA Moscow in the early part of his career, before moving to English FA Premier League club Chelsea in December 1992 for £400,000.

Chelsea
With Chelsea, Kharine impressed in their run to the 1994 FA Cup Final – though he conceded four goals in the final itself – and then the club's UEFA Cup Winners' Cup run a year later, where they reached the semi-finals in their first European campaign since the 1970s. His later years at the club were blighted by injury problems and the signing of Dutch goalkeeper Ed de Goey, which limited him to 20 appearances in his last three seasons. In total, he played in 146 games for Chelsea.

Kharine was not fit for inclusion in Chelsea's FA Cup Final triumph at the end of the 1996–97 season (Norwegian Frode Grodås played instead), and was not chosen in the squad for the Cup Winners' Cup and League Cup final victories a year later. When Gianluca Vialli became Chelsea manager he established de Goey as the club's first choice goalkeeper; Kharine was limited to five appearances that season, mainly in cup games. He remained at the club as a reserve goalkeeper for a further two seasons after this.

Celtic
Kharine signed for Scottish side Celtic in the summer of 1999 on a free transfer. He arrived at Celtic Park as the first signing of new management team John Barnes and Kenny Dalglish, but injury problems ensured that he played just 11 games for the club (8 in the league).

Hornchurch
He was released in the summer of 2002 and signed for non-League club Hornchurch, where he was sent off on his debut.

International career
Kharine was also an international; as a result of the political turmoil in his home nation, he ended up playing for three different teams. He won six caps for the USSR, eleven for the CIS and then 23 for Russia. Aided in part by the short-lived nature of the CIS, he was their most-capped player. He represented the Soviet Union at the 1988 Summer Olympics, winning a gold medal in the football competition. He played for the CIS at the 1992 European Championships, performing well in the 0–0 draw with the Netherlands in Gothenburg; and for Russia at USA 94 and Euro 96, with his team going out in the group stages on each occasion. He won his last cap in September 1998 against Ukraine.

Coaching career
Kharine joined Luton Town in 2004 as the club's goalkeeping coach. He remained with the club until 2013 when he was released from his contract. Kharine then joined fellow league two side Stevenage until he left in 2015 shortly after Teddy Sheringham had left. Kharine is now the goalkeeping coach at Hemel Hempstead Town.

Personal life
His younger brother Mikhail Kharin played football professionally as well. Mikhail's son Filipp Kharin is now also a professional goalkeeper.

Career achievements
Dmitri Kharine achieved the following successes during his football career: 1985 U'16 European Champion, 1986 USSR Cup Winner, 1988 Olympic Champion, 1990 U'21 European Champion, 1991 USSR League Champion, 1992 Runner's Up Russian Cup & 1994 Runner's Up F.A. Cup.

Career statistics

Club

International
Statistics accurate as of match played 5 September 1998

Honours
Chelsea
 FA Cup: 1996–97
 Football League Cup / EFL Cup: 1997–98
 UEFA Cup Winners' Cup: 1997–98
 UEFA Super Cup: 1998

Celtic
 Scottish Premier League: 2000–01, 2001–02
 Scottish Cup: 2000–01
 Scottish League Cup: 1999–00, 2000–01

Soviet Union
 Olympic champion: 1988

References

External links
 
 Dmitri Kharine career stats at Post War English & Scottish Football League A – Z Player's Database
 International statistics

1968 births
Living people
FC Torpedo Moscow players
FC Dynamo Moscow players
PFC CSKA Moscow players
Chelsea F.C. players
Celtic F.C. players
Hornchurch F.C. players
Dual internationalists (football)
Expatriate footballers in England
Expatriate footballers in Scotland
Premier League players
Association football goalkeepers
Soviet Union under-21 international footballers
Soviet Union international footballers
Russia international footballers
Footballers from Moscow
Russian footballers
Soviet footballers
Olympic footballers of the Soviet Union
Olympic gold medalists for the Soviet Union
Footballers at the 1988 Summer Olympics
UEFA Euro 1992 players
1994 FIFA World Cup players
UEFA Euro 1996 players
Russian expatriate footballers
Scottish Premier League players
Soviet Top League players
Russian Premier League players
Olympic medalists in football
Russian expatriate sportspeople in England
Russian expatriate sportspeople in Scotland
Medalists at the 1988 Summer Olympics
Association football goalkeeping coaches
FA Cup Final players
Luton Town F.C. non-playing staff
Stevenage F.C. non-playing staff